Petros Persakis (born 1879 in Athens) was a Greek gymnast.  He competed at the 1896 Summer Olympics in Athens.

Persakis competed in the individual rings and team parallel bars events.  He placed third in the rings event.  In the team parallel bars, Persakis was a member of the Panellinios Gymnastikos Syllogos team that placed second of the three teams in the event, giving him a silver medal.

References

External links
 

1879 births
Year of death missing
Gymnasts at the 1896 Summer Olympics
19th-century sportsmen
Greek male artistic gymnasts
Olympic gymnasts of Greece
Olympic silver medalists for Greece
Olympic bronze medalists for Greece
Olympic medalists in gymnastics
Medalists at the 1896 Summer Olympics
19th-century Greek people
20th-century Greek people
Gymnasts from Athens
Date of birth missing
Place of death missing